American Juniors is an American reality television singing competition series that was broadcast for one season from June 3 to August 19, 2003, on Fox. The series was a spin-off of American Idol, but with younger contestants. The show had the same production team as American Idol: it was created by Simon Fuller and 19 Entertainment along with FremantleMedia, directed by Bruce Gowers, and produced by Nigel Lythgoe and Ken Warwick.

Unlike American Idol, the goal of the competition was not to find a single winner, but rather to create a singing group of five of the contestants. In this way, American Juniors more closely resembled the British series S Club Search, which had produced the group S Club Juniors.

The show spawned the singing group American Juniors, consisting of Taylor Thompson, Tori Thompson, Chauncey Matthews, Lucy Hale, and Danielle White. The group disbanded in 2005, after their self-titled studio album generated lackluster sales.

The show was filmed in Los Angeles.

Episodes

Auditions and Hollywood Week (June 3 and 10)
Two thousand young people auditioned for the show. A selected group of kids and their parents were flown to Hollywood to participate in "Hollywood Week", during which the field was narrowed to 20 performers who would move on to the live episodes.

Top 20 Semi-Final 1: Contestant Choice (June 17 and 18)
In each of two live "Top 20" semifinals, half of the remaining contestants competed for 5 positions in the Top 10, as determined by the votes of viewers. The results were aired the following evening.

Results
 Advanced to Top 10 Finals: Chauncey Matthews (most votes), Danielle White, AJ Melendez, Morgan Burke, Katelyn Tarver
 Celebrity performers: Justin Guarini
 Group performance: "Kids in America"

Top 20 Semi-Final 2: Contestant Choice (June 24 and 25)

Results
 Advanced to Top 10 Finals: Tori Thompson (most votes), Taylor Thompson, Jordan McCoy, Lucy Hale, Chantel Kohl
 Celebrity performers: Ruben Studdard
 Group performance: "Put a Little Love in Your Heart"

Top 10 (July 1 and 2)
Theme: Songs of 1969

Results
 Top 3: Chantel Kohl, Tori Thompson, and Taylor Thompson
 Top 2: Chantel Kohl and Taylor Thompson
 Advanced to American Juniors Group: Taylor Thompson
 Group performance: "Make Your Own Kind Of Music"
 Celebrity performers: Tamyra Gray
 Taylor's encore performance : "Proud Mary" (Creedence Clearwater Revival)

Top 9 (July 8 and 16)
 Theme: Songs of 1970
 Tori Thompson - "Love The One You're With" (Stephen Stills)
 Danielle White - "(They Long To Be) Close To You" (Burt Bacharach)
 Morgan Burke - "Love Grows (Where My Rosemary Goes) (Edison Lighthouse)
 Chauncey Matthews - "Hey There Lonely Girl" (Eddie Holman)
 Chantel Kohl - "Stony End" (Barbra Streisand)
 Jordan McCoy - "ABC" (Jackson 5)
 Katelyn Tarver - "We've Only Just Begun" (Carpenters)
 AJ Melendez - "I'll Be There" (Jackson 5)
 Lucy Hale - "Make It Easy On Yourself" (Dionne Warwick)

Results
 Top 3: AJ Melendez, Tori Thompson, and Chauncey Matthews
 Top 2: Chauncey Matthews and Tori Thompson
 Advanced To American Juniors Group: Tori Thompson
 Group performance: "United We Stand"
 Taylor Thompson's music video: "Cheeseburgers For Me"
 Celebrity performer: Brian McKnight
 Tori's encore performance: "Love The One You're With" (Stephen Stills)

Top 8 (July 23 and 24)
 Theme: Songs of 1962
 AJ Melendez - "The Night Has a Thousand Eyes" (Bobby Vee)
 Danielle White - "The Loco-Motion" (Little Eva)
 Chantel Kohl - "Don't Make Me Over" (Dionne Warwick)
 Chauncey Matthews - "Moon River" (Henry Mancini)
 Lucy Hale - "Breaking Up is Hard To Do" (Neil Sedaka)
 Morgan Burke - "Can't Help Falling in Love" (Elvis Presley)
 Jordan McCoy - "Sealed with a Kiss" (Bryan Hyland)
 Katelyn Tarver - "Tell Him" (The Exciters)

Results
 Top 3: Lucy Hale, Chauncey Matthews, and Chantel Kohl
 Top 2: Chauncey Matthews and Chantel Kohl
 Advanced to American Juniors Group: Chauncey Matthews
 Group performance: "Do You Love Me"
Taylor Thompson and Tori Thompson's music video: Bring the house down
 Celebrity performer: Kelly Clarkson
 Chauncey's encore performance: "Moon River" (Henry Mancini)

Top 7 (July 29 and 30)
 Theme: Songs of 1980
 Katelyn Tarver - "On the Radio" (Donna Summer)
 Morgan Burke - "Rock With You" (Michael Jackson)
 Jordan McCoy - "Magic" (Olivia-Newton John)
 Danielle White - "Daydream Believer" (Anne Murray)
 AJ Melendez - "Still" (Commodores)
 Chantel Kohl - "Brass In Pocket (I'm Special)" (Pretenders)
 Lucy Hale - "Call Me" (Blondie)

Results
 Top 3: AJ Melendez, Lucy Hale, and Chantel Kohl
 Top 2: Lucy Hale and Chantel Kohl
 Advanced to American Juniors Group: Lucy Hale
 Group performance: "It's Still Rock and Roll to Me"
 Taylor Thompson, Tori Thompson, and Chauncey Matthews's music video: Sundown
 Celebrity performer: Monica
 Lucy's encore performance: "Call Me" (Blondie)

Final Round (August 5 and 12)
 Theme: S Club Songs
 Morgan Burke - "Bring the House Down"
 Danielle White - "Never Had a Dream Come True"
 AJ Melendez - "Alive"
 Jordan McCoy - "You Are the One"
 Chantel Kohl - "Sundown"
 Katelyn Tarver - "Have You Ever"

Results
 Top 3: Danielle White, Chantel Kohl, and AJ Melendez
 Top 2: Danielle White and Chantel Kohl
 Final member of American Juniors: Danielle White
 Morgan Burke performs: "Build Me Up Buttercup"
 Katelyn Tarver performs: "I'll Never Fall In Love Again"
 Chantel Kohl performs: "Open Arms"
 Jordan McCoy performs: "More Today Than Yesterday"
 Danielle White performs: "Colors of the Wind"
 AJ Melendez performs: "I'll Be There"
 Group performance: "Kids In America"
 Danielle White's Encore performance: "Never Had a Dream Come True"
 Chantel Kohl's Encore performance: "Sundown"
 AJ Melendez's Encore performance: "Alive"
 Official American Juniors group perform: "One Step Closer"

Concert Special (August 19)
 American Juniors performs: "Reach"
 Danielle White and the American Juniors performs: "Never Had a Dream Come True"
 American Juniors performs: "Bring It All Back"
 Debbie Gibson performs "Lost in Your Eyes"
 Lucy Hale and the American Juniors performs: "Have You Ever"
 Gladys Knight performs: "If I Could"
 Gladys Knight and the American Juniors perform
 American Juniors performs: "One Step Closer"
 American Juniors performs: "(You Got to Have) Friends"

Ratings and aborted second season
American Juniors became one of the highest-rated television shows of the summer season, with approximately 11.9 million viewers on June 3, though the numbers dropped 40% toward the end of July. Nonetheless, the producers were satisfied of the strong teen demographic. A second season was planned for fall 2003, later postponed to the summer after the third season of American Idol, then called off.

Following the show
Upon completion of the competition, the American Juniors group consisted of Taylor and Tori Thompson, Chauncey Matthews, Lucy Hale, and Danielle White. The group made a brief appearance on the December 2003 TV special An American Idol Christmas. Their debut album American Juniors was released on October 26, 2004, after a year's delay from its original scheduled date. The group disbanded in 2005, after having received relatively little publicity.

Almost 20 years after the TV series, Lucy Hale is now the most widely known contestant from American Juniors, having acted in a number of films and television shows, most notably the series Pretty Little Liars from 2010 to 2017. She returned to her musical roots in 2014, with the release of the country album Road Between on Disney Music Group's "Nashville" label.

Katelyn Tarver released her debut solo album, Wonderful Crazy, in 2005. From 2010 to 2013, she played Jo Taylor in the Nickelodeon TV series Big Time Rush. She has continued to act and release music. In 2019, she appeared on NBC's Songland.

Jordan McCoy was signed to Diddy's label, Bad Boy Records, having only released demos. She was part of the late-2000s revival of the defunct girl group, Dream (also formed by Diddy).

In 2011, Tori and Taylor Thompson resurfaced on NBC's The Voice as a singing duo. They were selected and coached by Cee Lo Green but were voted off in the first live show.

In 2020, American Juniors semifinalist Grace Leer auditioned for season 18 of American Idol. She made it to Hollywood after singing "Crowded Table" by The Highwomen. She eventually was eliminated at the Top 11.

References

External links
 

2000s American reality television series
2003 American television series debuts
2003 American television series endings

American Idol
American television spin-offs
English-language television shows
Fox Broadcasting Company original programming
Television series about children
Television series by Fremantle (company)
Reality television spin-offs
Television shows directed by Bruce Gowers
Music competitions in the United States
American television series based on British television series